Khulna University of Engineering & Technology commonly known as KUET, formerly BIT, Khulna, is a public engineering university of Bangladesh, which emphasizes education and research in engineering and technology. It was founded in 1967 as an engineering college before gradually converting into a university.

Academics

Academic structure
The academic division of KUET is organized in 20 departments under three faculties. Sixteen departments offer undergraduate courses. Among the Department of Industrial Engineering and Management ( IEM ) provides an Industrial and Production Engineering (IPE) degree to the undergraduate students.
 Faculty of Civil Engineering
 Department of Civil Engineering ( CE )
 Department of Urban and Regional Planning ( URP )
 Department of Building Engineering & Construction Management ( BECM )
 Department of Architecture (ARCH)
 Department of Mathematics ( MATH )
 Department of Chemistry ( CH )
 Department of Physics ( PH )
 Department of Humanities ( HUM )
 Faculty of Electrical and Electronic Engineering
 Department of Electrical & Electronic Engineering ( EEE )
 Department of Computer Science & Engineering ( CSE )
 Department of Electronics and Communication Engineering ( ECE )
 Department of Biomedical Engineering ( BME )
 Department of Materials Science and Engineering (MSE)
 Faculty of Mechanical Engineering
 Department of Mechanical Engineering ( ME )
 Department of Industrial Engineering and Management ( IEM )
 Department of Leather Engineering ( LE )
 Department of Textile Engineering ( TE )
 Department of Energy Science and Engineering ( ESE )
 Department of Chemical Engineering ( ChE )
 Department of Mechatronics Engineering ( MTE)

Number of students

Institutes
There are three institutes at KUET for advanced research:
 Institute of Information and Communication Technology (IICT, KUET).
 Institute of Disaster Management (IDM, KUET).
 Institute of Environment and Power Technology (IEPT, KUET).

KUET journals and research bulletins 
 Journal of Engineering Science

KUET in World University Rankings 
KUET has ranked in a number of reputed University rankings. The 2022 QS World University Rankings ranked the university 401-500 in Asia. The 2023 Times Higher Education World University Rankings ranked the university 1201-1500 in the world, and 801-1000 in Engineering subject ranking.

Achievements 
34 teachers from different faculties of KUET have been ranked among world's best scientists  in the AD Scientific index published in October 2021.

List of vice-chancellors 

 Quazi Sazzad Hossain
Mihir Ronjon Halder[present]

Admissions

The admission process in KUET is highly competitive. Each year it opens about 1005 seats for undergraduate programs. About 10,000 applicants are invited to appear on an admission test. This preliminary filtration is done based on H.S.C. grade points in physics, chemistry, mathematics and English. The admission test is standardized to evaluate student ability to understand concepts of physics, chemistry, mathematics, and English language. Admission is offered to successful applicants on a merit basis, based on their scores in the admission test.

Students are admitted to a specific undergraduate academic program specializing in any of the 14 engineering tracks (e.g., CSE, EEE, ME, ECE, CE, IPE, BECM, TE, LE, URP, BME, Arch, ESE, MSE). Students may not change their track (major) once a few weeks of classes are passed.

Admission is open to mainly to Bangladeshi nationals. There are 5 reserved seats for "small ethnic group" students who have to undergo the same admission process. A few seats are also open to international students. The international admission process is separate from local admissions

Campus

Khulna University of Engineering & Technology (KUET) is at Fulbarigate, the northwest part of Khulna City (the third-largest south-western divisional city in Bangladesh). The campus is about 15 kilometers from the zero point of Khulna City.

The KUET campus covers 101 acres. It is divided into four functional zones: residential zone for students; residential zone for faculty and staff; academic zone for academic buildings and workshops; and cultural-cum-social and recreational zone for students. Being square in shape, the third zone is midway between the two residential zones to reduce walking distances.

The main academic building accommodates the teaching and research facilities. Each department is a separate entity with a courtyard around, and all the departments constitute an integrated complex. Heavy engineering laboratories are on the ground floor or other separate workshops. Light laboratories, classrooms and project rooms are on the upper floors. Separate offices for every member of the teaching staff are next to his/her laboratory.

Library
KUET central library runs in two sections: the General Library and the Reference Library. The General Library provides in-house reading and short-time borrowing of books and other reference material. The Reference Library provides an in-place reading.

The General Library system has 50,635 books, journals and periodicals. A library automation project to modernize and to improve administrative control over the collection of books, journals, proceedings, theses, etc. has recently been completed under Higher Education Quality Enhancement Project. Moreover, the library is enriched every year by collecting recent books and journals.

Besides the general library system, each academic department maintains a rent-based library from which students can borrow textbooks at a nominal rate for the semester. Recently, KUET library has entered into a full automation system.

Medical center

The on-campus, two-storied KUET Medical Center provides primary and basic health care facilities to its students free of charge. 8 full-time MBBS doctors, 2 nurses, 1 Medical Technologist, and 2 staff provide the care. For specialized consultation on complicated cases, medical center refers the patients to specialists through ambulance.

Transportation
For the convenience of the students, faculties, officers, and staff KUET operates its own Shuttle Bus Service between Khulna City and the campus. On weekends special services are also provided for meeting the weekend recreational and other needs.

Central computer center
The central computer center (CCC) of KUET was established in 1988 under the supervision of the Department of Electrical and Electronic Engineering with six IBM desktop computers donated by BEXIMCO. To provide a fully integrated set of information support to the teaching, research and administrative functions, in 2006 it became us on independent center of KUET in a newly decorated building under the supervision of a nominated chairman from the university.

The CCC has served over the years as the hub for computer-related services in the campus with the commissioning of the university-wide network.

It has strong IT infrastructure with around 256 Mbit/s broadband line from BTCL and BdREN with 1 Mbit/s from other ISP as backup for Internet facility, routers for routing, a firewall for internet security, five high configuration server as mails server, proxy server, database server, seven midlevel configuration of workstations for other servers and backup server, a core switch, several manageable and unmanageable switches for intranet connectivity. It is planned to increase the bandwidth and to expand and renovate the optical backbone network including student halls of residence and teacher residential area secure access of the academic and research materials very soon.

Recently KUET has started a WiFi network in its Director of Student Welfare (DSW) and CCC arena for students and at the departments of Electrical & Electronic Engineering (EEE) and Electronics, Computer Science and Engineering (CSE), Communication Engineering (ECE) for teachers.

Student life

Halls of residence

There are seven residential halls (one female, six male). The administrative heads of a hall are its provost and assistant provosts. Usually, the halls have a single provost and one or more assistant provosts.

The residential halls provide facilities for the students, for example, hall library, prayer room, TV and recreational room including daily newspapers and magazines, etc. Generally, four students live in a room except for the two-seat rooms in Amar Ekushey Hall arranged for graduate students. These halls have dining rooms (Amar Ekushey Hall has two dining rooms) where monthly prepaid lunch and dinner are offered to the students.
 Bangabandhu Shiekh Mujibur Rahman Hall (named after founding leader of Bangladesh, Sheikh Mujibur Rahman)
 Amar Ekushey Hall (named in memory of martyrs of the Language Movement )
 Fazlul Haque Hall (named after the 1st Prime Minister of Bengal- Sher-e-Bangla A. K. Fazlul Huq)
 Lalan Shah Hall (named after the Lalon Fokir, Lalon)
 Khan Jahan Ali Hall (named after Muslim Sufi Saint, Khan Jahan Ali)
 Dr. M.A. Rahsid Hall (named after M. A. Rashid, the first vice-chancellor of BUET)
 Rokeya Hall (named after Begum Rokeya Social activist, writer, Muslim feminist)

Sports facilities 
KUET has a large playground at the eastern periphery of the main academic campus. It is used as venue of annual athletics competition of the university as well as cricket, football competitions. Students can access the facility all year round. KUET has tennis court in the main academic area. It also has a gymnasium near halls of residence where students can do gymnastics.

Scholarship
KUET Excellence Scholarship 
Erasmus Mundus Scholarship
Arif Ahmed Scholarship
KUETian@Qatar Scholarship
Dr. Naseem Uddin Scholarship
Dr. Ramiz Uddin Mollah Scholarship 
KCC FSM Scholarship Programme 
Scholarship for PhD students from "Prime Minister's Research and Higher Education Fund" 
Scholarships from Indian Government 2019  
New Zealand Commonwealth Scholarship, 2019
Teaching Assistantship or Fellowship

See also
 List of universities in Bangladesh
Bangladesh University of Engineering and Technology 
Rajshahi University of Engineering & Technology
Chittagong University of Engineering & Technology
Dhaka University of Engineering & Technology

References

Educational institutions established in 1969
Technological institutes of Bangladesh
Public engineering universities of Bangladesh
1969 establishments in East Pakistan
Education in Khulna
Organisations based in Khulna
Engineering universities and colleges in Bangladesh
Educational institutions of Khulna District
Khulna University of Engineering & Technology